This is a list of active and extinct volcanoes in Fiji.

References

Islands of Fiji, Island Directory, United Nations Environment Programme

Fiji
 
Volcanoes